The light-vented bulbul (Pycnonotus sinensis), also called the Chinese bulbul, is a species of bird in the bulbul family found in central and southern China, Hong Kong, Macao, northern Vietnam, southern Japan and Taiwan, with occasional records from South Korea. A common species of songbird that favors lightly wooded habitats, it can frequently be seen in towns, suburbs and urban parks within its range.

Taxonomy and systematics
The light-vented bulbul was originally described in the genus Muscicapa.

Subspecies
Four subspecies are recognized:
 P. s. sinensis (Gmelin, JF, 1789) – Found in central and eastern China.
 P. s. hainanus (Swinhoe, 1870) – Originally described as a separate species in the genus Ixos. Found in south-eastern China and northern Vietnam.
 P. s. formosae Hartert, E, 1910 –  Found on Taiwan.
 P. s. orii Kuroda, 1923 – Found on Yonaguni, Okinawa, Iriomote and Ishigaki Islands (southern Ryukyu Islands).

Description
The particular characteristic of the light-vented bulbul is the large white patch covering the nape and the sides of its black head. It also sings very brightly and variably with a cha-ko-lee...cha-ko-lee... sound.
It has white plumage from its eyes to the back of its head. The chicks of the light-vented bulbul are always singing; they hop on tree branches, and do not fear humans.

Distribution and habitat
In Hong Kong, the light-vented bulbul is abundant in lightly wooded areas, cultivated land and shrubland, whereas the red-whiskered bulbul is the common bulbul of suburbs and urban parks.

In Taiwan, however, the light-vented bulbul dominates all of these habitats, though it is replaced along the east coast by Styan's bulbul. Chinese bulbuls are seen frequently in Shanghai, where it is perhaps the third most common bird after tree sparrows and pearl-necked doves.  The light-vented bulbul is also found on the Korean Peninsula and in Vietnam.

References

 Birds Korea

light-vented bulbul
Birds of China
Birds of Japan
Birds of Hong Kong
Birds of Taiwan
light-vented bulbul
light-vented bulbul